William Brawley (born 19 March 1984) is a Scottish football midfielder.

Career
Brawley started his career with Motherwell, but was sacked along with 19 others when the club went into administration, and joined Partick Thistle. Brawley didn't feature for the Thistle first team, and dropped out of the senior game to sign for Selkirk.

In June 2005, Brawley took part in the Clyde open trials. He impressed new manager Graham Roberts, and was given a contract. Brawley only made a handful of substitute appearances, including coming off the bench at Ibrox Stadium in Clyde's Scottish League Cup tie against Rangers. He was released from his contract in January 2006, and rejoined Selkirk. He spent the 2006-07 season with Bellshill Athletic. It is unknown what he has done since then.

See also
Clyde F.C. season 2005-06

References

External links

Living people
Scottish footballers
Motherwell F.C. players
Partick Thistle F.C. players
Clyde F.C. players
Scottish Football League players
1984 births
Bellshill Athletic F.C. players
Association football midfielders
Footballers from Motherwell
Selkirk F.C. players